Isanthrene echemon is a moth of the subfamily Arctiinae. It was described by Herbert Druce in 1884. It is found in Guatemala and Mexico.

References

 

Euchromiina
Moths described in 1884